The Mystery of the Missing Hour is a Big Finish Productions audio drama based on the popular British science fiction television series Sapphire & Steel.

Plot
Sapphire and Steel arrive in Cairo, 1926 to solve an impossible murder...

Cast
Steel — David Warner
Sapphire — Susannah Harker
Narrator — Colin Baker
Lady Marjorie — Sarah Douglas
Arthur — Ian Hallard
Jane — Cate Debenham Taylor
Cornelius — Ian Brooker
MC — Nigel Fairs

Notes
At the beginning of the fourth episode, in a fourth wall breaking moment in which they play themselves, Cate Debenham Taylor says to Sarah Douglas, "I thought I recognised your name. Weren't you the baddie in Superman II? I used to love that film!" This refers to her role as the Kryptonian criminal Ursa in both the aforementioned film and its predecessor, Superman. Later, Douglas mentions Murder, She Wrote and the fact that Angela Lansbury's character Jessica Fletcher happened to come across a murder in every episode of the series. In real life, Douglas appeared in the Murder, She Wrote Season Two episode "Sing a Song of Murder" in 1985.

External links
Big Finish Productions - Sapphire & Steel: The Mystery of the Missing Hour
Sci-fi Online Review

Sapphire & Steel audio plays
2007 audio plays